Tom Andrews (April 30, 1961 – July 18, 2001) was an American poet and critic.

Life 

Thomas Chester Andrews grew up in Charleston, West Virginia. He got into the Guinness World Records at the age of eleven by clapping for fourteen hours and thirty one minutes. He had dreams of being a stand up comedian. He raced motocross as a teenager, but he stopped when he found out he had hemophilia. He  had a major accident on an icy sidewalk that put him in the hospital for many weeks.

He worked as a copy editor for "Mathematical Review," a bibliographic journal for mathematicians, physicists, statisticians, logicians, historians, and philosophers of mathematics.

While he is best known for his poetry, he also wrote criticism and a memoir, Codeine Diary: True Confessions of a Reckless Hemophiliac.

Education 

Andrews graduated from Hope College (Summa Cum Laude) in 1984, spending second semester of his senior year at Oberlin College as an intern for FIELD (magazine). In 1987 he graduated from the University of Virginia with an M.F.A. in Creative Writing.

Poetry 

Poet and critic Lisa Russ Spaar has called Tom Andrews "One of the great stylists — and one of the best, and under-known, poets — of the past 20 years." His collection, The Hemophiliac's Motorcycle, is available online for free through the University of Iowa Press.

Some scholars have examined his work through the lens of disability; as a hemophiliac, much of his poetry seems concerned with the body as spectacle, in its achievements as well as its limitations. As professor Susannah Mintz puts it in her article Lyric Bodies: Poets on Disability and Masculinity, published in PMLA in March 2012, "the speaker [of the title poem in The Hemophiliac's Motorcycle] presents himself as paradoxical: at risk and highly skilled, competitive and communal, worthy of respect for his talent and potentially feared or derided for the strange behavior of so metaphorically charged a substance as his blood."

Personal life

Andrews married Carrie Garlinghouse in the late 1980s. They divorced in 1993.

At the time of his death, Andrews was engaged to Alice B. Paterakis of Athens, Greece, whom he had met at the American Academy in Rome, where both had been fellows. They were to be married the week before he died.

Death 

Andrews died in a London hospital on July 18, 2001, as a result of complications from thrombotic thrombocytopenic purpura, a rare blood disease. He was forty years old.

He was buried in Kirkland Memorial Gardens in Mason County, West Virginia.

Praise for Tom Andrews 

Poet Jean Valentine said "He is a true poet, loving, tough, ecstatic."

Guy Davenport, one of the country's most powerful critics, said "These are not poems about illness. They are about the dominion of the spirit when it is rich in imagination and courage."

Awards

 Iowa Poetry Prize, for The Hemophiliac’s Motorcycle 
 1989 National Poetry Series Award, for Brother’s Country
 2000 Rome Prize, Literature, from the American Academy of Arts and Letters
 2001 Guggenheim Fellowship

Works

Poetry

Criticism
"The World as L. Found It", The Ohio Review, No. 57, 1997

Memoir

Anthology

References

External links
 "Levis Remembered", Blackbird
 "The Hemophiliac's Motorcycle", University of Iowa Press
 "Beauty is a Verb" Cinco Puntos Press. Ed by Jennifer Barlett, Shelia Black, and Michael Northern 2011  
 "Poetry Puts Alum on Secure Ground," News from Hope College. 1989. 21:03 December, p 8. 
 "Tom Andrews Memorial Reading," Hope College

1961 births
2001 deaths
Poets from West Virginia
20th-century American poets
Hope College alumni
University of Virginia alumni
Writers from Charleston, West Virginia